John A. Tester (March 30, 1835May 26, 1918) was a Swiss American immigrant, merchant, and Republican politician.  He was a member of the Wisconsin State Assembly, representing Buffalo County in the 1883 session.

Biography
Born in Rongellen, the Canton of Grisons, Switzerland, Tester moved with his parents to St. Louis, Missouri, in 1848 and then to Wisconsin in 1853. He served in the 6th Wisconsin Volunteer Infantry Regiment as first lieutenant during the American Civil War. He served as deputy county treasurer for Buffalo County, Wisconsin, and on the Buffalo County Board of Supervisors. He also served on the Alma, Wisconsin, village board as trustee and as president.

References

External links

1835 births
1918 deaths
Swiss emigrants to the United States
People from Graubünden
People from Alma, Wisconsin
People of Wisconsin in the American Civil War
Union Army officers
Businesspeople from Wisconsin
County supervisors in Wisconsin
Republican Party members of the Wisconsin State Assembly
19th-century American politicians
19th-century American businesspeople